Lembata Regency is a regency in East Nusa Tenggara province of Indonesia. Established on 4 October 1999 (under administrative Law UU 52/1999) from part of East Flores Regency, the regency covers the island of Lembata (formerly known as Lomblen), together with three small offshore islands together forming the eastern part of the Solor Archipelago, and has its administrative seat (capital) in Lewoleba.  The population of the Regency was 117,829 at the 2010 decennial census and at the 2020 census was 135,930; the official estimate as at mid 2021 was 137,630.

Administrative Districts 
The regency is divided into nine districts (kecamatan), tabulated below with their areas and their populations at the 2010 census and 2020 census. The table also includes the location of the district headquarters, the number of villages (rural desa and urban kelurahan) in each district, and its post code.

Notes: (a) includes offshore island of Pulau Sewanggi. (b) includes offshore islands of Batutara and Watonubi. (c) includes regency capital of Lewoleba town. (d) six villages have postcode of 86611-86616; twelve villages have postcode of 86682.

Geography

Mount Ile Lewotolok, an active volcano, is located in the north central part of Lembata Island.  In November 2020, it erupted, leading to the evacuation of over 4,000 people from areas close to the volcano.

References

External links 

 

Regencies of East Nusa Tenggara